Imaad Fortuin (born Bjorn Fortuin; 21 October 1994) is a South African professional cricketer. He made his international debut for the South Africa cricket team in September 2019.

Domestic career
He was included in the North West cricket team squad for the 2015 Africa T20 Cup. In August 2017, he was named in Durban Qalandars' squad for the first season of the T20 Global League. However, in October 2017, Cricket South Africa initially postponed the tournament until November 2018, with it being cancelled soon after.

In June 2018, he was named in the squad for the Highveld Lions team for the 2018–19 season. In October 2018, he was named in Paarl Rocks' squad for the first edition of the Mzansi Super League T20 tournament. He was the leading wicket-taker in the 2018–19 CSA T20 Challenge tournament, with fifteen dismissals in ten matches. In August 2019, he was named the CSA T20 Challenge Player of the Season at Cricket South Africa's annual award ceremony.

In September 2019, he was named in the squad for the Paarl Rocks team for the 2019 Mzansi Super League tournament. In April 2021, he was named in Gauteng's squad, ahead of the 2021–22 cricket season in South Africa. On 1 April 2022, in Division One of the 2021–22 CSA One-Day Cup, Fortuin took his first five-wicket haul in List A cricket.

International career
In August 2019, he was named in South Africa's Twenty20 International (T20I) squad for their series against India. He made his T20I debut for South Africa, against India, on 18 September 2019. In January 2020, he was named in South Africa's One Day International (ODI) squad for their series against England. He made his ODI debut for South Africa, against England, on 7 February 2020.

In September 2021, Fortuin was named in South Africa's squad for the 2021 ICC Men's T20 World Cup.

Personal life
On 24 April 2021, Fortuin converted to Islam, adopting the Muslim name of Imaad. He is the second South African international cricketer, after Wayne Parnell, to convert to Islam.

References

External links
 

1994 births
Living people
South African cricketers
South Africa One Day International cricketers
South Africa Twenty20 International cricketers
North West cricketers
Paarl Rocks cricketers
Cricketers from Paarl
South African Muslims
Converts to Islam